Cato Hamre Andersen (born 10 June 1959) is a Norwegian former ice hockey player. He was born in Oslo. He played for the Norwegian national ice hockey team at the 1984 Winter Olympics.

References

External links

1959 births
Living people
Ice hockey people from Oslo
Norwegian ice hockey players
Olympic ice hockey players of Norway
Ice hockey players at the 1984 Winter Olympics